The Global Network of People living with HIV (GNP+) is an international network representing all people living with HIV and AIDS. Their main agenda covers sexual and reproductive health/rights, human rights and the empowerment of people living with HIV and is named by GNP+ as the "Global Advocacy Agenda". This agenda was agreed upon at the 1999 International Conference of People Living with HIV/AIDS in Warsaw, Poland.
GNP+ is located in Amsterdam, The Netherlands.

Purpose
GNP+ advocates to improve the quality of life of all HIV positive people.

Funding
Funding for the "Global Advocacy Agenda" is currently from the UK Department for International Development (DfID), the Netherlands Ministry of Development Cooperation, and the Norwegian Agency for Development Cooperation (Norad).

See also
 ICW

References
 DFID Press release

External links
 Global Network of People living with HIV/AIDS

HIV/AIDS organizations
International medical and health organizations
International organisations based in the Netherlands